= Skatespots =

Skateboarding app

SkateSpots
- Industry: Mobile app and Skateboarding
- Founded: 2011
- Headquarters: Los Angeles, California, U.S.
- Key people: Daniel Nilsson; Andreas Pringle; Daniel Loren
- Products: Mobile app
- Website: skatespots.com.au

Skatespots is a skateboarding spot finder application for Apple iOS and Android devices developed by Daniel Nilsson and Andreas Pringle. Later, they partnered up with Los Angeles, California based skateboard photographer Daniel Loren to help develop the design and market the app on the US market. Using the application, users can search and find skateboarding spots and skate parks in their vicinity, take photos and upload their own spots and share it with the Skatespots community or keep the spot secret. Users can also discover where the professional skateboarders skate in their video parts, upload videos to spots and comment on others spots. As of April 2015, there were more than 10,000 spots. The app has received good reviews from various respected Skateboarding blogs and magazines as well as receiving "Top Choice Award" from the tech blog appcrawlr.com
